Schmidt's helmet skink (Tribolonotus schmidti), also known commonly as Schmidt's crocodile skink, is a species of lizard in the family Scincidae. The species is endemic to Guadalcanal in the Solomon Islands.

Etymology
The specific name, schmidti, is in honor of American herpetologist Karl Patterson Schmidt.

Habitat

Description
It has two rows of enlarged plate-like dorsal scales running down the center of the back. Each row contains more than 20 scales from the back of the head to the beginning of the tail.

Reproduction
T. schmidti is viviparous.

References

Further reading
Adler GH, Austin CC, Dudley R (1995). "Dispersal and speciation of skinks among archipelagos in the tropical Pacific Ocean". Evolutionary Ecology 9: 529–541.
Austin CC, Rittmeyer EN, Richards SJ, Zug GR (2010). "Phylogeny, historical biogeography and body size evolution in Pacific Island Crocodile skinks Tribolonotus (Squamata: Scincidae)". Molecular Phylogenetics and Evolution 57: 227–236.
Burt CE (1930). "Herpetological Results of the Whitney South Sea Expedition IV. Descriptions of New Species of Lizards from the Pacific Islands (Scincidæ)". American Museum Novitates (427): 1–3. (Tribolonotus schmidti, new species, p. 3).
Roux J (1930). "Note sur un reptile scincidé des îles Salomon présentant des pres pédiaux ". Verhandlungen der Naturforschenden Gesellschaft in Basel 41: 129–135. (Pediporus schmidti, new combination, p. 129). (in French).

Tribolonotus
Reptiles of the Solomon Islands
Reptiles described in 1930
Taxa named by Charles Earle Burt